The Schweriner Fernsehturm is a 136.5-metre-tall communications tower built of steel-concrete between 1960 and 1964 in Schwerin, Germany. Unlike most other TV towers, the ground plan is a spherical triangle and not a cylindric cross section. Also its tower basket, which also contains a restaurant, has no round form, but looks instead like a triangle with round sides. From 1991 to November 28, 1999, the restaurant was closed. In the neighbourhood of this tower at 53°35'30,98" N and 11°27'19,8" E, there is a 273-metre-high, radio mast for FM-radio and TV.

External links 
 
 http://www.skyscraperpage.com/diagrams/?b1708
 
 http://www.skyscraperpage.com/diagrams/?b46001

Towers completed in 1964
Communication towers in Germany
Buildings and structures in Schwerin
Restaurant towers
1964 establishments in East Germany